This is a list of notable individuals who are of full or partial Kurdish origin who grew up and/or live in Germany.

Academia and Medicine
 Jamal Nebez, linguist, mathematician, politician, author, translator and writer
 Bachtyar Ali, novelist, intellectual, literary critic, essayist, and poet
 Khalil Rashow, academic, writer, and researcher
 Nadia Murad – human rights activist and Nobel Peace Prize laureate
 Khanna Omarkhali -  academic and researcher
 Gülşen Aktaş, educator

Athletes

 Agit Kabayel, boxer
 Deniz Naki, football player
 Mahmoud Dahoud, football player
 Baker Barakat, boxer and kickboxer
 Mirkan Aydın, football player
 Aias Aosman, football player
 Joan Oumari, football player
 Hassan Oumari, football player
 Dilan Ağgül, football player

Musicians

Rappers

 Haftbefehl (Kurdish father and Turkish mother)
 KC Rebell
 Eko Fresh (Kurdish mother and Turkish father)
 Azad 
 Xatar 
 Kurdo 
 Eno 
 Capo (Kurdish father and Turkish mother)
 AK Ausserkontrolle 
 Fero47 
 Bero Bass

Singers

 Namosh
 Ferhat Tunç
 Engin Nurşani
 Nizamettin Ariç
 Hozan Canê

DJs
 Kurd Maverick

Politicians
in German parties

 Sevim Dağdelen, German politician and a member of the Left Party (die Linke) 
 Gökay Akbulut, German politician and social scientist. She is currently serving in the Bundestag (federal parliament) as a member of The Left Party from the German federal state of Baden-Württemberg
 Leyla Güven, Kurdish Politician
 Lamiya Haji Bashar, human rights activist. She was awarded the Sakharov Prize jointly with Nadia Murad in 2016
 Ali Atalan, Kurdish-German politician of Yazidi faith. He is a former member of the Landtag of North Rhine-Westphalia with Die Linke in Germany, and the Turkish Parliament with the Peoples' Democratic Party (HDP)
 Cansu Özdemir, German politician of The Left from Hamburg. She is a member of the Hamburg Parliament
Muhterem Aras,  German politician of the Alliance 90/The Greens party. She has been a Member of the Landtag of Baden-Württemberg for the constituency Stuttgart I since May 2011, and Landtagspräsidentin (speaker) since May 2016
 Hüseyin Kenan Aydın, German politician of Zaza descent and member of Die Linke.
in foreign parties or organisations
 Haji Ahmadi (Iran; grew up in Iran and lives in exile in Germany)
 Leyla İmret (grew up in Germany and lived in Turkey)
Feleknas Uca (grew up in Germany and lives in Turkey)

Directors
 Züli Aladağ, film director, film producer, and screenwriter (Kurdish and Turkish origin) 
Ayşe Polat, script writer and film director

Writers and Literature

 Seyran Ateş (Kurdish father and Turkish mother)
 Rohat Alakom 
 Düzen Tekkal 
 Bachtyar Ali 
 Eskerê Boyîk, writer 
 Fatma Aydemir, author and journalist

Miscellaneous
 Hatun Sürücü, victim of a so-called "honor killing" by her youngest brother in 2005

See also
Kurds in Germany
List of Kurds
Kurdish diaspora

References

Germany
Kurds in Germany
Kurdish